The 1940 United States Senate election in Wyoming took place on November 5, 1940. Democratic Senator Joseph C. O'Mahoney ran for re-election to a second full term. He faced Republican Milward Simpson, a member of the University of Wyoming Board of Trustees and a former State Representative, in the general election. Though the presidential election in Wyoming was relatively close, O'Mahoney outperformed President Franklin D. Roosevelt's narrow win, and defeated Simpson in a landslide to win his second term.

Democratic primary

Candidates
 Joseph C. O'Mahoney, incumbent U.S. Senator
 Cecil W. Clark, former Weston County Prosecuting Attorney

Results

Republican Primary

Candidates
 Milward Simpson, member of the University of Wyoming Board of Trustees, former State Representative
 Harry B. Henderson, Jr., State Senator 
 Charles E. Winter, former U.S. Congressman
 Irving W. Dinsmore, former State Senator 
 R. R. Crow, State Representative

Results

General election

Results

References

1940
Wyoming
United States Senate